Skelton and Brotton is a civil parish in the unitary authority of Redcar and Cleveland, England. It consists of the town of Skelton-in-Cleveland and village of Brotton, which had a combined population of 18,952 in 2002, reducing to 12,848 at the Census 2011. 

The modern Skelton Castle incorporates part of the ancient stronghold of Robert de Brus who held it from Henry I. A modern church replaces the ancient one, of which there are ruins, and a fine Norman font is preserved. The large ironstone quarries have not wholly destroyed the appearance of the district. The Cleveland Hills rise sharply southward, to elevations sometimes exceeding , and are scored with deep and picturesque glens. On the coast, which is cliff-bound and fine, is the watering-place of Saltburn-by-the-Sea.

References

External links
Skelton & Brotton Parish Council
Redcar & Cleveland Borough Council
History of Skelton in Cleveland

Places in the Tees Valley
Redcar and Cleveland
Civil parishes in North Yorkshire